The 2003 Sylvania 300 was an NASCAR Winston Cup Series race held on September 14, 2003 at New Hampshire International Speedway, in Loudon, New Hampshire. Contested over 300 laps on the 1.058 mile (1.702 km) speedway, it was the 27th race of the 2003 NASCAR Winston Cup Series season. Jimmie Johnson of Hendrick Motorsports won the race.

Background
New Hampshire International Speedway is a  oval speedway located in Loudon, New Hampshire which has hosted NASCAR racing annually since the early 1990s, as well as an IndyCar weekend and the oldest motorcycle race in North America, the Loudon Classic.  Nicknamed "The Magic Mile", the speedway is often converted into a  road course, which includes much of the oval. The track was originally the site of Bryar Motorsports Park before being purchased and redeveloped by Bob Bahre. The track is currently one of eight major NASCAR tracks owned and operated by Speedway Motorsports.

Summary
This race marked the last time that the long-standing NASCAR rule of racing back to a yellow caution flag was in place. During the race, Dale Jarrett spun and hit the wall in turn 4 and came to rest in the middle of the racetrack's front stretch. Leaders slowed down except Michael Waltrip, who attempted to put several cars a lap down; he and others raced past Jarrett's immobilized car at full speed and some barely avoided contact with him. Beginning with the next race, the MBNA America 400 at Dover, in addition to other rule changes for the Cup, Busch, and Truck series, NASCAR outlawed racing back to the caution. Instead, NASCAR froze the field immediately at the caution and allowed the first car one lap down (or multiple laps down, if there were no cars one lap down) to rejoin the lead lap; this is officially called the "free pass" by NASCAR but is widely known by fans and journalists as the "lucky dog" rule, due to Aaron's sponsoring the free pass on television broadcasts for a number of years.

Top 10 results

Race Statistics
 Time of race: 2:58:41
 Average Speed: 
 Pole Speed: 
 Cautions: 6 for 38 laps
 Margin of Victory: 6.240 sec
 Lead changes: 20
 Percent of race run under caution: 12.7%         
 Average green flag run: 37.4 laps

References

Sylvania 300
Sylvania 300
NASCAR races at New Hampshire Motor Speedway
September 2003 sports events in the United States